Peggy R. Palmer (born July 6, 1945) is an American former politician from Kansas. She served as a Republican in both chambers of the Kansas State Legislature, and as a county commissioner for Butler County.

Palmer was born in Wichita. She was active in politics, working as a campaign manager for Kenneth King during his successful run for the Kansas House of Representatives. She lived for ten years in Saudi Arabia, after her husband, Tom Palmer, was sent there to work for Mobil Oil. The couple returned to Kansas in 1994, and Palmer credits her time in Saudi Arabia with leading her to enter public service in America. As a state legislator, she lived in Augusta, Kansas, where she worked as a realtor.

After returning from Saudi Arabia, Palmer ran for the State House when King retired in 1996, with his endorsement. She won, and was re-elected in 1998 and 2000. In 2004, Palmer successfully challenged fellow Republican David R. Corbin in the primary election for Kansas State Senate in the 16th district, taking 61% of the vote. She cruised to victory in the 2004 general election as well, with 69% of the vote.

Palmer declined to run for re-election to the Senate in 2008, and her seat was claimed by Ty Masterson. She was appointed to a county commissioner seat in Butler County in 2010 and was re-elected without opposition in 2012 before retiring from politics in 2017.

References

Republican Party Kansas state senators
Republican Party members of the Kansas House of Representatives
County commissioners in Kansas
Women state legislators in Kansas
20th-century American politicians
21st-century American politicians
People from Augusta, Kansas
1945 births
Living people
20th-century American women politicians
21st-century American women politicians
Politicians from Wichita, Kansas